Micandra is a genus of butterflies in the family Lycaenidae.

The  members (species) of this genus are found  in the Neotropical realm.

Species
M. aegides (Felder & Felder, 1865)
M. comae (Druce, 1907)
M. cyda (Godman & Salvin, 1887)
M. dignota (Draudt, 1921)
M. ion (Druce, 1890)
M. platyptera (Felder & Felder, 1865)
M. sylvana (Lathy, 1936)

External links

Funet Taxonomy Distribution

Eumaeini
Lycaenidae of South America
Lycaenidae genera
Taxa named by Ernst Schatz